Bronisław Piotr Piłsudski (2 November 1866 – 17 May 1918) was an ethnologist who researched the Ainu people after he was exiled by Tsar Alexander III of Russia to the Far East.

Piłsudski considered himself Samogitian, Lithuanian, and Polish. Thus some sources identify him as Lithuanian, others as Polish.

In addition to the Ainu, he conducted research on the Orork and Nivkh indigenous peoples of Sakhalin Island.

Piłsudski pioneered research into Lithuanian cross crafting.

Early life
Piłsudski was born on November 2, 1866 in the Vilna Governorate of the Russian Empire in present-day Lithuania. He was one of four brothers, including Józef, Adam, and Jan. Józef later served as the Chief of State and First Marshal of Poland. Bronisław and Józef Piłsudski moved to Vilnius in 1874, where they continued self-education for three years. After their mother's death in 1886, they left together for Saint Petersburg. Bronisław Piłsudski passed an examination at a local university.

Exile & Study of Ainu 
For his involvement with a socialist in a plot to assassinate Alexander III of Russia in 1887 together with Vladimir Lenin's brother Aleksandr Ulyanov, Bronisław was initially sentenced to death, later commuted to fifteen years of hard labor on Sakhalin island (Ulyanov was hanged). He used his time there to conduct research. While on Sakhalin in 1891, he met ethnographer Lev Sternberg. Piłsudski was then sent to the island's southern part. The rest of his prison sentence was changed to ten years of internal exile because he had settled without permission from the Russian authorities.

Research into the Ainu 
Three years later, Piłsudski was given a grant by the Imperial Russian Academy of Sciences to study the Ainu. That year he settled in an Ainu village, fell in love with an Ainu woman, Chufsanma, officially married her and had a son and daughter, Sukezo and Kiyo, with her. His wife was a niece of Chief Bafunkei of the village of Ai in Sakhalin. In 1903 he recorded the Ainu language. From these original recordings, an Ainu dictionary of over a thousand words was made, which was translated into over ten languages.  Piłsudski also wrote down the myths, culture, music and customs of the Ainu. He built an elementary school in the village where he taught Russian language and mathematics to the local children. The schools were open only in winter, the slack season of the farm.

In 1904 the Russo-Japanese War broke out. Due to the rumor that if one spoke Russian he would be conscripted into the Russian Army, the locals began refusing to learn Russian. Also, Ainus were prepared to cooperate with the Japanese after they landed on Sakhalin. A local told Piłsudski that he would not send his son to the school. Chief Bafunkei told Piłsudski to return to Poland while the war continued. Piłsudski reluctantly agreed with him.

Piłsudski moved to Japan by himself, where he was befriended by Ōkuma Shigenobu, Futabatei Shimei, Torii Ryūzō, Katayama Sen, and others, and helped an organization of anti-imperial Russian refugees. Among them, Futabatei Shimei became Piłsudski's very close friend. He described Bronisław as:an 'odd ball' who was so kind-hearted and innocent like a child that he would always insist in a very excited tone that he needed to do something to help Ainus and that it was his destiny to do that despite the fact that he was always a 'complete broke' then".In the same year, Piłsudski arrived in Kraków, Austria-Hungary, after traveling from Japan via the United States.

World War I 
When there was upheaval preceding World War I, Piłsudski escaped to Switzerland. In 1917 he left for Paris, where he worked at the Paris office of the Polish National Committee, which had been founded by Roman Dmowski, the political archrival of Bronisław's younger brother Józef.

On 17 May 1918 Piłsudski drowned in the Seine River near the Pont Neuf. On 21 May 1918, his body was found near the Pont Mirabeau. His death was thought a suicide.

Piłsudski's descendants currently live in Japan.

See also
Polish Museum, Rapperswil

References

Sources 

"Piłsudski, Bronisław," Encyklopedia Powszechna PWN (PWN Universal Encyclopedia), Warsaw, Państwowe Wydawnictwo Naukowe, vol. 3, 1975, p. 521.
"Piłsudski, Bronisław," Encyklopedia Polski (Encyclopedia of Poland), Kraków, Wydawnictwo Ryszard Kluszczyński, 1996, p. 505.

The Collected Works of Bronisław Piłsudski 
The Collected Works of Bronisław Piłsudski, translated and edited by Alfred F. Majewicz with the assistance of Elżbieta Majewicz.

 Volume 1: The Aborigines of Sakhalin
 Volume 2: Materials for the Study of the Ainu Language and Folklore (Cracow 1912)
 Volume 3: Materials for the Study of the Ainu Language and Folklore II
 Volume 4: Materials for the Study of Tungusic Languages and Folklore
 Toward a Restoration of Bronisław Piłsudski’s Scholarly Bequeathal: Materials for International Symposium on Bronisław Piłsudski’s Phonographic Records and the Ainu Culture. University of Hokkaido, Sapporo, Japan. September 16–20, 1985

External links
 Bronisław Piłsudski's life and work
 Large volume of documents related to Bronisław Piłsudski from Józef Piłsudski Institute of America

1866 births
1918 deaths
People from Švenčionys District Municipality
People from Sventsyansky Uyezd
Anthropologists of the Ainu
Polish anthropologists
Polish exiles in the Russian Empire
1918 suicides
Suicides by drowning in France
Bronisław Piłsudski